Krea University is an Indian state private university located in Sri City, Andhra Pradesh. The liberal institution is backed by IFMR and focuses on interwoven learning. It was founded in 2018 by a team of academicians and industrialists. This includes Anand Mahindra, R. Seshasayee, Sajjan Jindal, Raghuram Rajan and many more. The existing IFMR Graduate School of Business was brought under the umbrella of Krea University.

History 
The university was established in 2018 under the Andhra Pradesh Private Universities (Establishment and Regulation) Amendment Act, 2018. The initial investment received was of Rs.750 crores, backed by IFMR, Chennai, and philanthropic contributions from several members of the governing council. The existing IFMR institution was brought under the Krea University umbrella as the IFMR Graduate School of Business.

‘Krea’ means ‘an action-oriented approach’ in Sanskrit. The university follows a homegrown pedagogy of ‘Interwoven Learning’. It was officially inaugurated on November 18, 2018. Over 200 students applied in the first 10 days. The university was one among the 19 universities recommended for the Institutes of Eminence (IoE) status in 2018.

Governance

Leadership 
As of August 16, 2022, Prof Nirmala Rao took charge as Vice Chancellor of Krea University. Prof S Sivakumar was the Officiating Vice-Chancellor of Krea University. He was preceded by Dr Mahesh Rangarajan. Ramkumar Ramamoorthy is the Pro Vice-Chancellor for Professional Learning. N Vaghul is the Chancellor and Kapil Viswanathan is the Chairman of the Executive Committee, while R Seshasayee is a member of the Executive Committee and Governing Council. The governing council also includes Anand Mahindra, Kiran Mazumdar-Shaw, Aditya Mittal, Dheeraj Hinduja, Sajjan Jindal, Anu Aga, Manjul Bhargava, John Etchemendy and Vishakha Desai. Dr Tara Thiagarajan, EY chairman and CEO Rajiv Memani, and Nobel laureate Esther Duflo are also on the council.

Courses and curriculum 
Krea University offers three-year residential undergraduate programmes in the liberal arts and sciences leading to BA (Honours) and BSc (Honours) degrees.

IFMR GSB 
IFMR GSB offers a two-year MBA programme where students can choose from eight different specializations. Capstone Business Simulation is part of the MBA programme.

They also have PhD programmes from Madras University, including Organisational Behaviour & Human Resource Management, Strategic Management, Finance, Information Systems & Data Science, Economics, Marketing, Operations and Management.

The university also offers a one-year online diploma in advanced finance and analytics (DAFA).

The Data Science certificate courses have been ranked amongst the “Top Ten Data Analytics Programs” in the country.

IFMR GSB has curated an Executive MBA programme with specialisation in finance, supply chain, human relations and industry relations for executives of L&T Construction.

Partnerships 
Krea University partnered with the University of Bristol to collaborate in the area of Sciences and Humanities at both student, faculty and research level. It also includes a 3+1 progression partnership for students at Krea, in flagship programmes offered by the University of Bristol.

Researchers from the Yale Economic Growth Center work closely with Inclusion Economics India Centre at Krea University.

For the Summer 2022 program, undergraduate students nominated from Krea University will participate in the Data and Policy Summer Scholar Program at the Harris School of Public Policy at UChicago.

Krea University has partnered with the Dalai Lama Centre For Ethics and Transformative Values to introduce ethics in its UG curriculum.

WayCool Foods has partnered with IFMR GSB at Krea University to kickstart a leadership development programme called LEAP (Learn. Emerge. Accelerate. Progress).

Krea University has inked a partnership with Kauvery Hospital to operate and maintain a health centre and pharmacy at the campus in Sri City.

Faculty 
V Anantha Nageswaran was Dean at IFMR GSB.

Ramachandra Guha is part of the faculty.

Prof. Aniket Aga (Associate Professor of Anthropology & Environmental Studies) and Prof Chitrangada Choudhury (Associate Professor of Practice in Environmental Studies & Public Policy) of Krea University have won the Ramnath Goenka Award for Excellence in Journalism in the "Environment, Science and Technology" category.

Panchali Ray teaches anthropology and gender studies  and Vinod Kumar Saranathan teaches biological sciences at Krea.

Lakshmi Padmakumari is an Assistant Professor of Finance at IFMR GSB.

Raghuram Rajan is a Member of the Executive Committee and Governing Council and has addressed the students at Krea on various occasions through sessions and webinars.

Dr. Sudip Roy is Visiting Associate Professor of Chemistry and  has been elected as a Fellow to the Royal Society of Chemistry.

Dr. Anannya Dasgupta directs the Centre for Writing and Pedagogy.

Learning Centres 
Krea University is home to the Centre for Writing and Pedagogy. In 2019, they conducted a workshop for teachers titled ‘Script Sound Sense: Teaching Critical Reading and Writing’.

On August 27, 2022, Union Minister of State for Education Dr Subhas Sarkar inaugurated a new academic block at the Sri City campus. Spread over 25,000 sq ft, it houses laboratories for physics, bio-sciences and chemistry departments. A 10,000 sq ft library has over one lakh books and is set to serve research faculties.

Research Centres

LEAD 
A non-profit research organization conducting high-quality scalable action research and outreach in development economics and finance. Programmes enabled include Initiative for What Works to Advance Women and Girls in the Economy (IWWAGE), Inclusive Cashless Payment Partnership (CATALYST) and Evidence for Policy Design (EPoD) India.

Abdul Latif Jameel Poverty Action Lab (J-PAL) 
A global research centre working to reduce poverty by ensuring that policy is informed by scientific evidence. In South Asia, it has partnerships in Bangladesh, India, Nepal, Pakistan, and Sri Lanka. Much of Nobel Laureates Abhijit Banerjee and Esther Duflo's work on randomized control trials for shaping policy in India was done at J-PAL South Asia.

Moturi Satyanarayana Centre for Advanced Study in the Humanities and Social Sciences 
The centre was inaugurated by vice president of India Venkaiah Naidu. It commemorates veteran freedom fighter, Member of the Constituent Assembly, the Provisional Parliament two-time Rajya Sabha member Moturi Satyanarayana.

Sapien Lab Centre for Human Brain and Mind 
The centre was inaugurated by K. Vijay Raghavan, former principal scientific adviser to the Government of India. It seeks to track and understand the impact of the changing environment on the human brain, and its consequences for the individual and society. The studies will be used to mitigate risks and enhance outcomes.

Culture 
IFMR GSB’s annual fest is Abhyudaya 2022. Guests in 2022 included director Gautam Vasudev Menon, academician and entrepreneur Dr. Rakesh Godhwaniand actor and storyteller Janaki Sabesh.

Academic achievements, research and events 
Sai Balaji, a second year BA student of economics and psychology at Krea University, was selected to be part of the Harvard College Project for Asian and International Relationships in February 2022.

Naveen Prasad Alex, A student of biological sciences at Krea University was selected as the junior fellow of New York Academy of Sciences. Naveen is also known for being one of the youngest butterfly researchers from the country. His research on butterflies was well talked about during the 26th edition of the Kerala Science Congress being organized at Kerala Agriculture and Veterinary University (KVASU) at Pookkodu 

Divya B, a student of Telangana Social Welfare Residential Educational Institutions Society, cleared the admissions process at Krea University and was supported with a full scholarship for academics and hostel fees.

Consulting, finance and technology companies hired over 95 percent of IFMR GSB students in 2022.

Indian Institute of Technology - Madras and Krea University, Chennai conducted a study that can help states boost medical deliveries.

Research was conducted by LEAD on the state of home-based women workers in the wake of the pandemic.

Krea University has set up an Atal Incubation Centre (AIC), Catalyst, under the aegis of the Atal Innovation Mission (AIM), which is a flagship initiative of NITI Aayog.

IFMR GSB organised the Research Symposium on Finance and Economics (RSFE) 2022.

Krea University conducted a webinar titled ‘R&D and National Prosperity' as a part of the ‘Krea Science Talks’ series.

A team of researchers from University of Glasgow, Tilburg University, Netherlands and Kings College, London studied the  ‘Parents Samvaad’ programme in Delhi government schools in November 2021. The team of researchers were represented for fieldwork by local project partner LEAD at Krea University.

References 




Krea University
2018 establishments in Andhra Pradesh
Educational institutions established in 2018
Tirupati district
Buildings and structures in Tirupati district